Barauni Refinery is an oil refinery located in Begusarai city in the state of Bihar, operated by Indian Oil Corporation. It was the dream project of Shri krishna Sinha the first chief minister of Bihar. It  was built in collaboration with the Soviet Union at a cost of Rs.49.4 crores and went on stream in July 1964. The initial capacity of 1 million tonnes per year was expanded to 3 million tonnes per year by 1969. The present capacity of this refinery is 6.100 million tonnes per year. Indian Oil Corporation has planned to expand its capacity from 6 million tonnes per year to 9 million tonnes per year  at the cost of $1.94billion.

Moving to green fuel 
Barauni Refinery was earmarked for its operational excellence in 2009 after winning the TPM excellence award in Category A. State-of-art eco-friendly technologies enabled the Refinery to produce environment-friendly green fuels complying with international standards. Barauni Refinery fully switched over to BS-III diesel w.e.f 1 June 2010. 1st batch of BS-III petrol was dispatched through Barauni Kanpur Pipeline (BKPL) on 13 August 2010. Bihar & Jharkhand was declared BS-III compliant since September 2010. New units like NHDT and ISOM for Motor Spirit Quality up-gradation were added in 2010.

Product Profile 
Barauni Refinery is primarily a diesel producing Refinery with over 54% of its product mix as HSD. Other products include kerosene, petrol, LPG, Naptha, Raw Petroleum Coke (RPC), sulphur and bitumen. It caters to fuel demands of the states of Bihar, West Bengal, Uttar Pradesh, Jharkhand and Madhya Pradesh. Nepal Oil Corporation also sources its fuel including, LPG from Barauni Refinery. Currently, over 42% of the dispatch of products at Barauni Refinery is through road followed by pipelines and rail.

See also
 Barauni IOC Township
Indian Oil

References

External links
 Barauni Refinery in IOC

Oil refineries in India
Energy in Bihar
Barauni
India–Soviet Union relations
Soviet foreign aid
India–Romania relations
Indian Oil Corporation buildings and structures
Energy infrastructure completed in 1964
1964 establishments in Bihar
20th-century architecture in India